Eupithecia viata is a moth in the family Geometridae. It is found in western China (Gansu).

The wingspan is about 21 mm. The forewings are pale pale buff and the hindwings are white.

References

Moths described in 2004
viata
Moths of Asia